Narendra Kumar (1 February 1940 – 28 August 2017) was an Indian theoretical physicist and a Homi Bhaba Distinguished Professor of the Department of Atomic Energy at Raman Research Institute. He was also an honorary professor at Jawaharlal Nehru Centre for Advanced Scientific Research.

Known for his research on disordered systems and superconductivity, Kumar was an elected fellow of all the three major Indian science academies – Indian Academy of Sciences, Indian National Science Academy, and National Academy of Sciences, India – as well as the American Physical Society and The World Academy of Sciences. The Council of Scientific and Industrial Research, the apex agency of the Government of India for scientific research, awarded him the Shanti Swarup Bhatnagar Prize for Science and Technology, one of the highest Indian science awards, for his contributions to physical sciences in 1985. In 2006, he received the Padma Shri, the fourth highest civilian honour of the Government of India, in the science and engineering category.

Biography

Born on the 1 February 1940 to Labha Mal Julka-Taravatti couple in Bilaspur in the Indian state of Chhattisgarh, Narendra Kumar obtained an honors degree in electronics and electrical communication engineering in 1962 from the Indian Institute of Technology, Kharagpur, passing the examination with second rank. He continued at IIT Kharagpur for his master's studies and before completing MTech with a first rank in 1963, he stood first in India in the All India Electronics Engineering Examination in 1962. After obtaining the master's degree, Kumar started his career in 1963 as a senior scientific officer at Defence Institute of Advanced Technology (then known as Institute of Armament Studies) and served there till his move to National Chemical Laboratory in 1965 as a B grade scientist.

Kumar resumed his studies in 1968 by enrolling for doctoral studies at the Indian Institute of Technology, Bombay and secured a PhD under the guidance of Krityunjai Prasad Sinha and Ram Prakash Singh in 1971. After doing his post-doctoral work at the laboratory of Maurice Pryce of University of British Columbia, he joined Indian Institute of Science as an assistant professor and served the institution for close to quarter of a century during which period, he held the position of a professor from 1975 to 1994. Kumar was appointed as the director of Raman Research Institute (RRI) in 1994 where he served until his superannuation in 2005. Post-retirement, he continued his association with RRI as the Homi Bhabha Distinguished Scientist and DAE chair professor. During his career, he has had visiting assignments at various institutions abroad such as University of Liège (1975–76), University of Warwick (1978–79), Drexel University (1984), National Autonomous University of Mexico (1985), McGill University (1987 and 1988) and International Centre for Theoretical Physics (1988–89). Kumar was also associated with Jawaharlal Nehru Centre for Advanced Scientific Research, a multidisciplinary research institute, where he held an honorary professor position and with Tata Institute of Fundamental Research as an adjunct professor since 2008.

Kumar lived in R. M. V. Extension in Bengaluru in Karnataka. He died on 28 August 2017.

Legacy

His doctoral studies at IIT Bombay gave Kumar the opportunity to work alongside noted physicists such as Krityunjai Prasad Sinha and Ram Prakash Singh and during his days at the University of British Columbia, he studied condensed matter physics with Maurice Pryce. He carried on his work on superconductivity and disordered systems at Indian Institute of Science and his collaboration with Pedro Pereyra and others yielded the Dorokhov-Mello-Pereyra-Kumar (DMPK) equation, a theory on multi-channel conductivity using the principle of maximum entropy, which has since been subjected to studies by several scientists. Besides his work on diffusion in glasses, Kumar has done extensive studies on random dynamical systems, especially on the nature of electron transport. His studies have been documented by way of a number of articles and the article repository of Indian Academy of Sciences has listed 167 of them. Kumar has published four books, Interaction-Magnetically-Ordered-Solids, coauthored with his mentor, Krityunjai Prasad Sinha, Invitation to Contemporary Physics, Deterministic Chaos: Complex Chance out of Simple Necessity and Quantum Transport in Mesoscopic Systems: Complexity and Statistical Fluctuations which is a monograph in the field of mesoscopic physics. He had also guided 12 doctoral students in their doctoral studies.

Kumar had been connected with the International Centre for Theoretical Physics (ICTP) since 1970, serving as an associate or senior associate until 1992 and as a staff associate from 1993 to 2010. He was a former member of the editorial board of Journal of Physics: Condensed Matter and various committees of The World Academy of Sciences. Kumar had been involved with the committees for the review of research institutions which included Tata Institute of Fundamental Research and Physical Research Laboratory and has been the chairman of the committee of the Council of Scientific and Industrial Research for selecting Shanti Swarup Bhatnagar Prize winners. He also served as the president of the Indian Academy of Sciences during 1998–2000.

Awards and honors
The Council of Scientific and Industrial Research awarded Kumar the Shanti Swarup Bhatnagar Prize, one of the highest Indian science awards, in 1985. He received the TWAS Prize in 1992 and the Indian Institute of Technology, Bombay, chose him for its Distinguished Alumnus Award in 1996. A year after receiving the Mahendra Lal Sircar Prize in 1997, Kumar was selected for the Goyal Award of Kurukshetra University in 1998, followed by the FICCI Award of the Federation of Indian Chambers of Commerce & Industry in 1999. The Indian Science Congress Association awarded him the C. V. Raman Birth Centenary Award in 2000, the same year as Kumar received the Meghnad Saha Medal of the Indian National Science Academy. The year 2006 brought him three major awards: the Padma Shri, the fourth highest Indian civilian honor, the R. D. Birla Award of the Indian Physics Association, and the Distinguished Materials Scientist Award of the Materials Research Society of India.

The Indian Academy of Sciences elected Kumar as their fellow in 1985 and Kumar was elected as a fellow by the Indian National Science Academy in 1987. He received elected fellowships of two science organizations in 1994, the National Academy of Sciences, India, and the American Physical Society. Kumar became a fellow of The World Academy of Sciences the next year. The award orations delivered by him include the Jawarharlal Nehru Birth Centenary lecture (1996) and the Jagadis Chandra Bose lecture (2008) of the Indian National Science Academy.

Selected bibliography

Books

Articles

See also

Langevin dynamics
Order and disorder
Stochastic process
Bose–Einstein condensate

Notes

References

Further reading

External links

1940 births
2017 deaths
People from Bilaspur, Chhattisgarh
Indian condensed matter physicists
Scientists from Chhattisgarh
Indian technology writers
IIT Kharagpur alumni
IIT Bombay alumni
Academic staff of Tata Institute of Fundamental Research
Academic staff of the Indian Institute of Science
University of British Columbia alumni
Academic staff of the National Autonomous University of Mexico
Academic staff of the University of Liège
Academics of the University of Warwick
Drexel University faculty
Academic staff of McGill University
Recipients of the Padma Shri in science & engineering
Recipients of the Shanti Swarup Bhatnagar Award in Physical Science
TWAS laureates
Fellows of the American Physical Society
Fellows of the Indian National Science Academy
Fellows of The National Academy of Sciences, India
TWAS fellows
Fellows of the Indian Academy of Sciences
20th-century Indian physicists